Angela Behelle (born October 5, 1971, in Auchel) is a French romance novel writer.

Biography 
Angela Behelle was born on October 5, 1971, in Auchel. She spent part of her childhood in Pas-de-Calais and studied law at the University of Lille. After her studies, she moved to Burgundy in the department of Yonne.

In June 2012, she published an erotic saga, La Société, about the life of a secret society in the service of influential men. The story led to controversy on French social networks.  In 2013, La Société was published as a paperback edition by Éditions J'ai lu. The same year, rumours about a film adaptation reached enthusiastic fans of the series, when Eric Porcher from Kap films and Arnaud Kerneguez from Kanibal searched for an erotic novel to adapt for the screen.

In 2017, a spin-off of the series was published.

Bibliography

La Société 

 Qui de nous deux?, Paris, J'ai lu, "Librio", 2013 
 Mission Azerty, Paris, J'ai lu, "Librio", 2014 
 À votre service, Paris, J'ai lu, "Librio", 2014 
 La Gardienne de l'Oméga, Paris, J'ai lu, "Librio", 2014 
 L'Inspiration d’Émeraude, Paris, J'ai lu, "Librio", 2015 
 La fille du boudoir, Paris, J'ai lu, "Librio", 2016 
 Sur la gamme, Paris, J'ai lu, "Librio", 2016 
 Le Premier Pas, Paris, J'ai lu, "Fantasme Poche", 2017 
 Secrets diplomatiques, Paris, J'ai lu, "Fantasme Poche", 2017 
 Paris-New York, Paris, J'ai lu, "Fantasme Poche", 2017

Spin-off of La Société
 L'Enjeu, Paris, Pygmalion, "Novels", 2017

Novels  
 Voisin, Voisine, Paris, J'ai lu, "J'ai lu pour elle", 2014 
 Au bonheur de ces dames, Paris, Éditions Blanche, "Blanche", 2015 
 Le Caméléon, Paris, Pygmalion, "Novels", 2016 
 Loup y es-tu?, Paris, Pygmalion, "Novels", 2018

Books under pen name Sylvie Barret  
 Demandez-moi la lune!, Paris, J'ai lu, "J'ai lu pour elle", 2015 
 Les Terres du Dalahar, Paris, J'ai lu, "Darklight", 2016

References

External links 
 Personal website
 Presentation on the website J'ai lu pour elle

1971 births
Living people
French women novelists
21st-century French novelists
21st-century French women writers
Women from Burgundy
Writers from Burgundy
Writers from Nord-Pas-de-Calais